General Accident plc was a large insurance business based in Perth, Scotland. It merged with Commercial Union in 1998 to form CGU plc.

History

The Norie-Miller years

The Employers' liability act of 1880 opened a new area of insurance and one of the many companies formed to serve that market was formed in Perth, Scotland in 1885. The General Accident and Employers’ Liability Assurance Association was launched by local businessmen with a capital of only £5,000 and its main object was to provide local farmers and others with accident insurance. Its first policy was written in March 1886 and at its opening AGM it reported premium income of £2,700. What happened then was to radically change the future of the insurer, with the appointment of the 27-year-old Francis Norie-Miller as Secretary and manager. Norie-Miller had previously been the Assistant Manager of Mercantile Accident of Glasgow. His reign spanned over half a century, remaining as managing director until 1939 and chairman until 1944; during that time, he took General Accident from a small local firm to a major international insurer.

By the time of the second AGM, branches had been opened in “all the important centres of the U.K.” and more than 800 agents appointed. Early financial results were encouraging but there were “heavy claims” in 1889.  Fresh capital was raised and in 1891 the Association was reconstituted as The General Accident Assurance Corporation with an authorised capital of £100,000. As well as extending its geographic coverage, General Accident widened the range of policies. In 1890 it issued its first burglary policy, moved into the much larger fire insurance market in 1895 and, following the repeal of the Locomotives Act 1865 (the Red Flag Act) in 1896, started issuing motor policies. By the end of the 1890s, there were 20 branch offices and over 6,000 agencies. Overseas expansion began in the United States in 1899 and by 1914 there were offices on all continents. Marking its move into a full composite company, General Accident began issuing life assurance policies in 1906, changing its name to General Accident Fire and Life Assurance Corporation. By the onset of World War I premium income was £1.5 million.

Like many insurers, General Accident suffered losses in early years of the war but became profitable in the latter years. Post-war growth was rapid, led by motor insurance and by 1924, premiums reached £5.4 million. A hire purchase subsidiary was formed in 1923 and in the same year the Road Transport and General Insurance Company was acquired. Other acquisitions included the General Life Assurance Company, which became the centre for the group's life business and the Scottish Automobile and General Insurance Company, a Glasgow motor insurer. Between 1925 and 1935 the number of offices doubled and premium income exceeded £8 million. In 1933. Norie-Miller became chairman; while also remaining as managing director, his son Stanley became General Manager eventually serving as chairman from 1951 until 1968.

Further growth

In the post-war period General Accident acquired several new subsidiaries including the Yorkshire Insurance Company in 1967, despite a higher bid from Phoenix Assurance. By 1975 assets reached £1 billion and by the early 1980s assets were over £3 billion; total premium income was in excess of £1.5 billion, a third of which came from the US, By the late 1980s, General Accident had become increasingly acquisitive. In the UK this included a move into estate agency, soon to be loss-making. By the end of the 1980s, GA had acquired over 500 estate agencies. In this way, General Accident enlarged its housing insurance business and created new channels for the distribution of other insurance products, especially lucrative life policies. The move into the estate-agency business was not successful: the depressed British mortgage market produced considerable losses. On the other side of the world, General Accident bought NZI Corporation, a New Zealand-based insurance and banking firm, in 1988, intending to use it to expand into the Pacific market; it too was soon loss-making. The 1990 accounts (the first on line at Companies House) showed premium income of £3.5 billion but a £121 million pre-tax loss in 1990. After three years of losses, General Accident bounced back to record profits in 1993.  This was followed by the purchase of the life assurance company, Provident Mutual in 1996.

The merger

In response to the trend for consolidation in the international insurance market, General Accident announced a merger with Commercial Union in 1997, a year in which General Accident made record profits of £511 million. The merger was effected in June 1998 and the new merged company was named CGU plc.

Buildings

General Accident moved to a purpose-built head office at 2 High Street, Perth in 1899; the building was extended in 1958. The company also used Viewlands House, to the west of the city centre, as a training college.

It moved to a new head office at Pitheavlis on Necessity Brae in 1983.

References

Aviva
Financial services companies established in 1885
Insurance companies of the United Kingdom
Companies formerly listed on the London Stock Exchange
1885 establishments in Scotland
Financial services companies disestablished in 1998
1998 disestablishments in Scotland
Companies based in Perth, Scotland